Meredith Anne Gardner (born June 29, 1961) is a Canadian retired freestyle skier who competed in ski ballet, mogul skiing, and aerial skiing.  Gardner competed as a member of the Canadian Women's Freestyle Team from 1981 to 1988, winning the 1985 and 1988 World Championship in aerial skiing.

Gardner was inducted into the Canadian Ski Hall of Fame in 1995.

References

Canadian female freestyle skiers
1961 births
Living people
Skiers from Toronto